Catecholborane (abbreviated HBcat) is an organoboron compound that is useful in organic synthesis. This colourless liquid is a derivative of catechol and a borane, having the formula C6H4O2BH.

Synthesis and structure
Traditionally catecholborane is produced by treating catechol with borane (BH3) in a cooled solution of THF. However, this method results in a loss of 2 mole equivalents of the hydride. Nöth and Männig described the reaction of alkali-metal boron hydride (LiBH4, NaBH4, of KBH4) with tris(catecholato)bisborane in an ethereal solvent such as diethyl ether. In 2001, Herbert Brown and coworkers prepared catecholborane by treatment of tri-o-phenylene bis-borate with diborane.

Unlike borane itself or alkylboranes, catechol borane exists as a monomer. This behavior is a consequence of the electronic influence of the aryloxy groups that diminish the Lewis acidity of the boron centre.  Pinacolborane adopts a similar structure.

Reactions
Catecholborane is less reactive in hydroborations than borane-THF or borane-dimethylsulfide.

When catecholborane is treated with a terminal alkyne, a trans vinylborane is formed:
C6H4O2BH + HC2R → C6H4O2B-CHCHR
The product is a precursor to the Suzuki reaction.

Catecholborane may be used as a stereoselective reducing agent when converting β-hydroxy ketones to syn 1,3-diols.

Catecholborane oxidatively adds to low valent metal complexes, affording boryl complexes.
C6H4O2BH  +  Pt(PR3)2 →  (C6H4O2B)Pt(PR3)2H

References

Benzene derivatives
Organoboron compounds
Boranes